The Herakleia head is the portrait of a probable Achaemenid Satrap of Asia Minor of the late 6th century, found in Heraclea, in Bithynia, modern Turkey. The head is now located in the Museum of Anatolian Civilizations in Ankara.

Overview
The man depicted in the sculpture was probably a Satrap under Darius I. The man is the service of the Achaemenid Empire is bearded and mustachioed, but probably a Greek from Asia Minor rather than a Persian. The statue is made of marble, and was probably made by a Greek sculptor. The sculpture has been dated to circa 530 BCE, or at least Late Archaic.

The Herakliea head is considered as an early attempt towards portraiture with a realistic likeliness. This Eastern portrait in purely East Greek Archaic style, is one of the two known forerunners of extant Greek portraits, together with the Sabouroff head. It is comparable with the Sabouroff head, from about the same period. These nearly life-like portraits allow to define a date for early portraiture which is much earlier than had been previously thought. The first truly individualistic portrait is often considered to be the 470 BCE portrait of Themistocles. In numismatics also, the first portraits of rulers appear with the coins of Themistocles as ruler of Magnesia, and continue with the nearby rulers of Lycia towards the end of the 5th century BCE.

The Herakleia head is also an important marker for the depiction of Satraps in the period. In particular, the banned Athenian general Themistocles, who became Achaemenid Satrap in Magnesia, is seen wearing a tight bonnet with Olive wreath on some of his coins (circa 465-459 BCE). This possibly reflects the headwear of Achaemenid Satraps, such as seen in the Herakleia head.

References

6th-century BC works
Archaeology of the Achaemenid Empire
Ancient Greek art
Archaeological discoveries in Turkey
Officials of Darius the Great
Sculptures
Achaemenid Anatolia